The 2015 Rugby World Cup was an international rugby union tournament held in England and Wales from 18 September until 31 October 2015. 20 national teams competed, each bringing a squad of 31 players to the tournament. 
Each team had to submit their squad to World Rugby by 31 August 2015. A player could be replaced for medical or compassionate reasons, but would be unable to return to the squad. Any replacement players had an enforced stand-down period of 48 hours before they could take the field.

Players marked (c) were the nominated captains for their teams. All details, such as number of international caps and player age, are as of the opening day of the tournament on 18 September 2015.

Squads

Pool A

Australia
On 21 August, Australia announced their 31-man squad.

1 On 29 September, Sam Carter and James Hanson were called up to the squad to replace Will Skelton and Wycliff Palu, injured during Australia's game with Uruguay.

Head coach:  Michael Cheika

England
On 27 August, England announced their 31-man squad.

1 On 28 September, Nick Easter was called up to the squad to replace Billy Vunipola, injured during England's game with Wales.

Head coach:  Stuart Lancaster

Fiji
On 21 August, Fiji announced their 31-man squad.

1 On 25 September, Timoci Nagusa was called up to the squad to replace Waisea Nayacalevu, injured during Fiji's game with Australia.

2 On 27 September, Taniela Koroi was called up to the squad to replace Isei Colati, injured during Fiji's game with Australia.

Head coach:  John McKee

Uruguay
On 30 August, Uruguay announced their 31-man squad.

Head coach:  Pablo Lemoine

Wales
On 31 August, Wales announced their 31-man squad.

After injuries to Rhys Webb and Leigh Halfpenny during Wales' warm-up match against Italy, Mike Philips and Eli Walker were called up to replace the injured duo.

On 14 September, Eli Walker was released from the squad following injury and was replaced with Ross Moriarty.

1 On 21 September, Tyler Morgan was called up to the squad to replace Cory Allen who tore his hamstring in Wales's opening win against Uruguay.

2 On 28 September, Gareth Anscombe and James Hook were called up to the squad to replace Hallam Amos and Scott Williams who were injured in Wales's win against England.

3 On 11 October, Liam Williams was ruled out of the World Cup having suffered an injury against Australia, and Eli Walker re-joined the squad to replace him. Walker was allowed to re-join the squad, as he was released from the team before Wales officially arrived in tournament.

Head coach:  Warren Gatland

Pool B

Japan
On 31 August, Japan announced their 31-man squad.

Head coach:  Eddie Jones

Samoa
On 11 August, Samoa announced their 31-man squad.

On 24 August, Faifili Levave was called up to replace Fa'atiga Lemalu who withdrew due to injury.

On 11 September, Census Johnston was called up to replace Logovi'i Mulipola.

Head coach:  Stephen Betham

Scotland
On 1 September, Scotland announced their 31-man squad.

On 14 September, Kevin Bryce replaced Stuart McInally in the squad following injury.

1 On 29 September, Blair Cowan replaced Grant Gilchrist in the squad following injury.

2 On 17 October, Rory Sutherland replaced Ryan Grant in the squad following injury.

Head coach:  Vern Cotter

South Africa
On 28 August, South Africa announced their 31-man squad.

1 On 27 September, Jan Serfontein was called up to the squad to replace captain Jean de Villiers, injured during South Africa's game with Samoa.

Head coach:  Heyneke Meyer

United States
On 1 September, the United States named their 31-man squad.

On 3 September, Scott LaValla was replaced by Matt Trouville following an injury suffered in training.

Head coach:  Mike Tolkin

Pool C

Argentina
On 16 August, Argentina announced their initial 31-man squad.

Hours after the 31-man squad was announced, Matías Díaz suffered an injury and was replaced in the squad by Juan Pablo Orlandi.

1 On 15 October, Juan Figallo was called up to the squad to replace Nahuel Tetaz Chaparro after he suffered an injury in training.

2 Due to an injury to Agustín Creevy, usual prop Lucas Noguera Paz will cover hooker from the bench against South Africa in the Bronze Final. However, an injury sustained in training for prop Marcos Ayerza ruled him out of the Bronze Final the day before the match, and Santiago García Botta was called up as his replacement. As there was no further cover for prop, García Botta was cleared to play in the match, despite the stand-down period of 48 hours before an injury replacement can take the field, though he is only permitted to play if absolutely required.

Head coach:  Daniel Hourcade

Georgia
On 1 September, Georgia announced their 31-man squad.

1 On 29 September, Anton Peikrishvili was called up to the squad to replace Davit Kubriashvili, injured during Georgia's game with Argentina.

Head coach:  Milton Haig

Namibia
On 27 August, Namibia announced their 31-man squad.

Head coach  Phil Davies

New Zealand
On 30 August, New Zealand announced their 31-man squad.

1 On 10 October, Joe Moody was called up to the squad to replace Tony Woodcock, injured during New Zealand's game with Tonga.

2 On 29 October, Pauliasi Manu was called up to the squad to replace Wyatt Crockett, injured during New Zealand's game with France.

Head coach:  Steve Hansen

Tonga
On 18 August, Tonga announced their 30-man squad, with an additional player yet to be named.

On 31 August, Tonga announced the 31st player to complete their squad.

Head coach:  Mana Otai

Pool D

Canada
On 25 August, Canada announced their 31-man squad.

On 10 September, Jake Ilnicki was called up to replace the injured Jason Marshall.

1 On 24 September, James Pritchard was called up to the squad to replace Liam Underwood, injured during Canada's opening game with Ireland.

2 On 28 September, Pat Parfrey was called up to the squad to replace Connor Braid, injured during Canada's game with Italy.

Head coach:  Kieran Crowley

France
On 23 August, France announced their 31-man squad.

1 On 20 September, Rémy Grosso was called up to the squad to replace Yoann Huget, injured during France's opening game with Italy.

Head coach:  Philippe Saint-André

Ireland
On 1 September, Ireland named their 31-man squad.

1 On 10 October, Jared Payne was ruled out of the World Cup having suffered an injury against Romania. He was replaced by Issac Boss on 17 October 2015.

2 On 12 October, Rhys Ruddock was called into replace Peter O'Mahony, who was ruled out of the World Cup having suffered knee ligament damage against France.

3 On 13 October, Mike McCarthy was called into replace Paul O'Connell, ruled out of the World Cup after tearing his hamstring during the group stage victory over France.

Head coach:  Joe Schmidt

Italy
On 24 August, Italy announced their 31-man squad.

On 1 September, Simone Favaro was called up to the squad to replace the injured Angelo Esposito.

On 10 September, Enrico Bacchin was called up to the squad to replace the injured Luca Morisi.

1 On 21 September, Michele Visentin was called up to the squad to replace Andrea Masi, injured during Italy's opening game with France.

2 On 5 October, Alberto De Marchi and Andrea Lovotti were called up to the squad to replace the injured Martin Castrogiovanni and Michele Rizzo.

Head coach:  Jacques Brunel

Romania
On 25 August, Romania announced their 31-man squad.

1 On 29 September, Vlad Nistor was called up to the squad to replace Ovidiu Tonita, injured during Romania's game with Ireland.

Head coach:  Lynn Howells

Player statistics
All statistics are to the original 31-man squad as of 18 September 2015. Statistics do not include players who joined a squad during the tournament.

Player representation by club

Player representation by league

Average age of squads

Squad caps

Previous World Cup experience

By tournaments

By matches

References

Squads
Rugby World Cup squads